Bryerson may refer to:

 Mrs. Bryerson, a fictional character from the television series Mona the Vampire
 Dawn Bryerson, a fictional character from the film Blackwoods

See also
 Bryer (disambiguation)
 Son (disambiguation)